A roller shutter, security shutter, coiling door, roller door or sectional overhead door is a type of door or window shutter consisting of many horizontal slats (or sometimes bars or web systems) hinged together.  The door is raised to open it and lowered to close it.  On large doors, the action may be motorized. It provides protection against wind, rain, fire and theft. In shutter form, it is used in front of a window and protects the window from vandalism and burglary attempts.

Applications
Roller shutters have many applications including doors for vans, garages, kitchens, schools, prisons and warehouses. They are also commonly used as window blinds in some European countries, such as Germany and Spain.

In some parts of the world, roller shutters are subsidized by local governments. In areas that are frequently exposed to inclement weather, roller shutters are used as a method of insulation, can protect windows against hail damage, and can be made to withstand high wind.

In some municipalities, building owners may have to request a permit or are disallowed from having certain types of roller shutters on the exterior of their building. The cost of these systems can be significant, with the cost being upwards of $25,000-40,000. Plywood boards can also act as a similar deterrent to theft and burglary.

Types and operation

 Built-on roller shutter door Describes the type where the roller shutter box is fixed to the exterior of the building facade.

 Built-in roller shutter doors Where the roller shutter box is built into the lintel above the window.

 Integrated roller shutter A roller shutter and window combined as a single unit.

 Roller shutter with tilting louvres A roller shutter with laths that tilt, similar to an external venetian blind.

 Manual With gear drive from the shutter roller traced through the building facade to a universal joint on the room side that is operated by a cranked winding handle.

 Manual tape A tape drive around a flange on the roller is traced through the building facade with pulley guides to an inertia reel on the room side:

 Spring Assist Spring assist roller shutters are operated by manually lowering or lifting the handle which is mounted to the curtain end slat. Most cost effective solutions for securing small spaces.

 Motorized/Electric With a tubular motor fitted within the roller axle tube. Automatic operation can be added. Controlled with a smartphone, remote or hardwired switch.

Components
 Slats Extruded or roll formed steel, aluminium or stainless steel. Single or multi wall. Hollow or insulated designs.

 Roller (or axle tube) Steel, aluminium tube supported at either end by an end plate.

 Shutter box Formed steel or aluminium extrusion box designed to protect shutter’s internal components. 

Shutter spring 
 Spring wire. Made from the spring wire, it also called torsion spring.
 Flat spring. Formed by hardened and tempered steel strips in coils. Common steel grades C67, CK67, SAE1070, etc.

Guide rail (or track)Steel or aluminium to retain the shutter curtain within the opening. Weather sealed to  increase product lifetime and reduce operating vibration.

Bottom slat Steel, aluminium or PVC to match the rest of the roller shutter curtain. Safety edge or rubber weather seal to reduce draught can be added.

 Lock Important part of roller shutter used to manually secure the curtain slats in place. Can be locked with slide lock and bullet lock. Slim key locks are installed within the end slat and have bars that securely lock shutter into the guide rails.

See also 
 Roller blind
 Roll-down curtain

References 

Doors
Windows